Alfred Stillé (October 30, 1813 – September 24, 1900) was an American physician.

Biography
Born in Philadelphia, Stillé studied classics at Yale, but was expelled for participating in the Conic Sections Rebellion. He then transferred to the University of Pennsylvania in the same year, where he received an A.B. degree in 1832. He went on to earn an A.M. from the University of Pennsylvania in 1835 and in 1836 an M.D. from the school's department of medicine. 

Stillé began to practice in his native city, but spent parts of 1841 and 1851 in Paris and Vienna. From 1854 to 1859 he was professor of medicine at the Pennsylvania Medical College and from 1864 to 1884 at the University of Pennsylvania, later becoming its Chair.

Stillé was one of the first physicians in America to distinguish between typhus and typhoid fever. His observations in this connection he made during a typhus epidemic in Philadelphia in 1836 and reported in 1838. He was elected as a member of the American Philosophical Society in 1852.

He acquired a great reputation as a practitioner, teacher, and writer, and was the first secretary, and in 1871–72 the president, of the American Medical Association. However, as evidenced by his later writings, he was also known for refusing to accept the germ theory or laboratory medicine.

Works
Among his numerous works are:
 Medical Education in the United States (1846)
 Elements of General Pathology (1848)
 Therapeutics and Materia Medica (1860; fourth edition, 1874)
 Epidemic Meningitis (1867)
 Cholera (1867)

He edited with A. Maisch the National Dispensary (1879).

Notes

References

External links

 
 

University of Pennsylvania faculty
American medical writers
American male non-fiction writers
Burials at Laurel Hill Cemetery (Philadelphia)
Physicians from Philadelphia
1813 births
1900 deaths
University of Pennsylvania School of Arts and Sciences alumni
Perelman School of Medicine at the University of Pennsylvania alumni
Presidents of the American Medical Association